The Action of 20 November 1779 was a naval engagement of the European theatre of the American Revolutionary War that took place in the Atlantic. It was fought between a 50-gun Royal Naval ship against an armed Spanish register merchant ship that carried 26 guns.

On 19 November 1779, HMS Hussar of 28 guns, under Captain Elliot Salter, was in company with HMS Chatham of 50 guns. They were convoying trade from Lisbon back to England when they saw a two-decked ship standing out of the convoy, and at once gave chase. Hussar came up with the ship the next day and, on observing the Spanish flag being hoisted, Salter gave the order to attack. Hussar came alongside the Spanish ship and opened fire and, having the weather gage, was able to rake the ship. After a number of broadsides and realizing resistance was useless, the Spaniard struck after nearly 45 minutes of action.

The Spanish ship was the Nuestra Senora del Buen Consejo, a Peruvian register ship from Lima pierced for 64 guns but mounting only 26 twelve-pounders with a crew of 120 sailors and marines. Consejo had 27 men killed and eight wounded with the rest captured; whilst the Hussar had four killed and ten wounded.

Buen Consejo carried a valuable cargo consisting of copper, pewter, cocoa, Jesuit's bark, minerals and private goods, all of which were taken by the British back to England.

References
Notes

Bibliography
 
 
 
 

Conflicts in 1779
Naval battles involving Great Britain
Naval battles of the Anglo-Spanish War (1779–1783)
Naval battles of the American Revolutionary War